XVIII Corps was a North Carolina corps of the Union Army during the American Civil War.

Origins and makeup 

The XVIII Corps was created on December 24, 1862. It was initially composed of five divisions stationed in North Carolina, making it one of the largest in the Union Army (though two were detached to join the  X Corps in early 1863), and placed under the command of General John G. Foster. By August 1863, most of the corps' original units were either disbanded or transferred elsewhere, but  Brig. Gen. George W. Getty's division (formerly of  IX Corps) and the bulk of the recently discontinued  VII Corps from Virginia were redesignated the XVIII Corps.

Operations 

During the spring of 1864, the corps—now commanded by General William Farrar Smith, formerly of  VI Corps—was transferred to Yorktown, Virginia, to join Maj. Gen. Benjamin Butler's Army of the James.  The corps played a major part in the unsuccessful operations in the  Bermuda Hundred, and was also heavily engaged at  Cold Harbor. On June 12,  Lt. Gen. Ulysses S. Grant sent Smith on a surprise march to seize Petersburg from the Confederate forces before Robert E. Lee could bring up the bulk of the Army of Northern Virginia. In the Second Battle of Petersburg, June 15-18, 1864, Smith made successful initial attacks against the outnumbered defenses of Gen. P.G.T. Beauregard; but after driving Beauregard's men from their outer entrenchments on the 15th, Smith, fearful of a Confederate counterattack, lost his nerve and did not press the attack when it could have resulted in the easy seizure of the city.

Commanders 

Smith was relieved of command in July due to ill health, and he was replaced by Edward O.C. Ord and later Godfrey Weitzel. Charles A. Heckman briefly commanded the corps following the wounding of General Ord during the Battle of Chaffin's Farm. John Gibbon was temporary commander of the corps in the month of September 1864. The corps occupied the line of entrenchments closest to the main Confederate line, and suffered heavy casualties in almost daily skirmishing for a month.  The corps was relieved of its position by X Corps on August 26, and the corps was sent first to the Bermuda Hundred, and later to the north bank of the James River. Its first division took part in the successful attack on Fort Harrison on August 29 during the Battle of Chaffin's Farm. The corps was also engaged on October 27 in the  Second Battle of Fair Oaks, fought over the same ground as the first battle in May 1862. The corps was ultimately discontinued in December 1864; as with X Corps, its white units went to join the new  XXIV Corps, while its black units joined  XXV Corps.

External links 
XVIII Corps history

18
Military units and formations established in 1862
1862 establishments in North Carolina
1864 disestablishments in the United States
Military units and formations disestablished in 1864